Harmon, Arkansas may refer to one of two places:

Harmon, Boone County, Arkansas
Harmon, Washington County, Arkansas